Malalbergo is a comune (municipality) in the Metropolitan City of Bologna in the Italian region Emilia-Romagna, located about  northeast of Bologna.  
 
Malalbergo borders the following municipalities: Baricella, Bentivoglio, Galliera, Minerbio, Poggio Renatico, San Pietro in Casale.

Twin towns — sister cities
Malalbergo is twinned with:

  Saint-Denis-de-Pile, France (2023)

References

External links
 Official website

Cities and towns in Emilia-Romagna